Heilbronn University of Applied Sciences,, is a German University of Applied Sciences with campuses in Heilbronn-Sontheim, in the centre of Heilbronn (Bildungscampus), in Künzelsau and Schwäbisch Hall. Heilbronn University of Applied Sciences ranks amongst the major institutions of Higher Education in the state of Baden-Württemberg where it caters for over 8,000 degree-seeking students on three campuses, namely Heilbronn, Künzelsau and Schwäbisch Hall.

The university’s second campus is located in Künzelsau, the economic centre of the Hohenlohe district, its third in Schwäbisch Hall.

History
 At April 17, 1961 the Staatliche Ingenieurschule Heilbronn (State Engineering School) was established in Heilbronn.
 Since 1965 it is located in Heilbronn-Sontheim.
 In 1969 the four existing technical study courses were complemented by the first economical course.
 In 1971 the school was renamed to Fachhochschule Heilbronn (University of Applied Sciences)
 In 1972 the study course medical computer science was founded in cooperation with the University of Heidelberg.
 In 1988 the outside campus Künzelsau opened.
 Since 2004 the diplom degrees were replaced by a bachelor/master-system.
 In 2005 the Fachhochschule was renamed to Hochschule Heilbronn (University).
 In 2009 the outside campus Schwäbisch Hall opened.
 In 2011 near the city centre of Heilbronn a new campus as part of the Bildungscampus Heilbronn was opened.
 In 2018 the Heilbronn University was renamed to Heilbronn University of Applied Sciences.

Overview

Faculties and courses 

 Mechanics and Electronics  with 5 bachelor and 6 master courses.

 Industrial and Process Engineering  with 3 bachelor and 2 master courses.
 Informatics  with 2 bachelor and 2 master courses
 Business and Transport Management  with 4 Bachelor courses.
 International Business  with 5 bachelor and 3 master courses.
 Economics and Engineering  with 8 bachelor and 4 master courses.
 Management and Sales  with 4 bachelor and 1 master courses.

Course Range 
Business-related subjects:
 Financial & Management Accounting
 Finance
 Human Resource Management
 International Management
 Marketing

Economic & Cultural Area Studies:
 Eastern Europe
 Francophone World
 Hispanic Countries
 Middle East and North Africa

Language Area Studies:
 Arabic
 French
 Russian
 Spanish

Partner universities 
Egypt (4)
 Misr - Misr International University (MIU)
 Alexandria - Pharos University
 GUC-German University in Cairo
 AUC - The American University in Cairo

Argentina (1)
 La Plata - National University of La Plata

Armenia (1)
 Yerevan - State Engineering University of Armenia

Australia (1)
 Sunshine Coast - University of Sunshine Coast

Brazil (4)
 Säo Paulo - Escola Superior de Propaganda e Marketing
 Recife - Federal University of Pernambuco
 Belo Horizonte - Federal University of Minas Gerais
 Federal University of Santa Maria - UFSM

Chile (1)
 Santiago de Chile - Universidad de Chile

France

 Université de Haute Alsace (Colmar)
 Université Lumière Lyon 2
 Université Catholique de Lyon
 Université Haut Savoie Mont Blanc (Chambéry, Bourget and Annnecy)
 ESC Clermont Business School
 IPAC Nice

Indonesia (2)
 UNDHIRA Dhyana Pura University
 University of Tarumanagara

Ireland (1)
 Dublin - Dorset College

Jordan (1)
 Amman - German Jordanian University

Cuba (2)
 Havana - University of Havana
 Santa Clara, Universidad Central "Marta Abreu" de Las Villas

Morocco (1)
 Rabat Business School

Tunisia (2)
 Tunis - University of Tunis
 Université de Carthage / IHEC Carthage

Approximate number of students 
In terms of number of students, Heilbronn University of Applied Sciences is the largest University of Applied Sciences in the state of Baden-Württemberg.
 Heilbronn: 5.868
 Künzelsau: 1.548
 Schwäbisch Hall: 952

References 

 Hochschule Heilbronn  
 HSHN CHE-Hochlranking

External links

  Official website, English portal 

 
Buildings and structures in Heilbronn
Organisations based in Heilbronn
1961 establishments in Germany
Educational institutions established in 1961
Universities and colleges in Baden-Württemberg
Universities of Applied Sciences in Germany